Julianowo may refer to the following places:
Julianowo, Greater Poland Voivodeship (west-central Poland)
Julianowo, Kuyavian-Pomeranian Voivodeship (north-central Poland)
Julianowo, Masovian Voivodeship (east-central Poland)
Julianowo, Pomeranian Voivodeship (north Poland)
Julianowo, Warmian-Masurian Voivodeship (north Poland)